Central Fire Station or Old Central Fire Station may refer to:

Denmark 
 Copenhagen Central Fire Station

Finland 
 Tampere Central Fire Station

Myanmar 
 Central Fire Station, Yangon

Singapore 
 Central Fire Station, Singapore

United States 
 Old Little Rock Central Fire Station, in Little Rock, Arkansas
 Old Central Fire Station (North Little Rock, Arkansas)
 Central Fire Station (Honolulu, Hawaii)
 Central Fire Station (Aurora, Illinois)
 Central Fire Station (Davenport, Iowa)
 Central Fire Station (Baton Rouge, Louisiana)
 Ruston Central Fire Station, in Ruston, Louisiana
 Central Fire Station (Shreveport, Louisiana)
 Central Fire Station (Portland, Maine)
 Central Fire Station (Brockton, Massachusetts)
 Central Fire Station (Falmouth, Massachusetts)
 Peabody Central Fire Station, in Peabody, Massachusetts
 Old Central Fire Station (Pittsfield, Massachusetts)
 Central Fire Station (Quincy, Massachusetts)
 Central Fire Station (Taunton, Massachusetts)
 Ann Arbor Central Fire Station, in Ann Arbor, Michigan
 Central Fire Station (Muskegon, Michigan)
 Central Fire Station (Jackson, Mississippi)
 Pascagoula Central Fire Station No. 1, in Pascagoula, Mississippi
 Clovis Central Fire Station, in Clovis, New Mexico
 Central Fire Station (Schenectady, New York)
 Central Fire Station (Greensboro, North Carolina)
 Municipal Building and Central Fire Station, 340, in Scranton, Pennsylvania
 Central Fire Station (Sioux Falls, South Dakota)
 Austin Central Fire Station 1, in Austin, Texas
 Fire Museum of Texas, in Beaumont, Texas
 Central Fire Station (Pampa, Texas)

See also
List of fire stations